The Foton View (福田风景) is a series of light commercial van produced by the Chinese automobile manufacturer Foton. First launched in 2000, the Foton View has since been available in a wide range of body configurations, including a minivan/MPV, minibus, panel van, crew van, and an ambulance.

Foton View/Foton View Alpha 

Originally launched in 2000, the early models of the Foton View heavily resemble the Toyota HiAce H100 vans. An updated model called the Foton View Alpha or Foton View Irland Act was launched to replace the original View models in October 2003.

Foton View Kuaiyun/Foton View Kuaijie/Foton View Kuaike 

The Foton View Kuaiyun (快运), Foton View Kuaijie (快捷), and Foton View Kuaike (快客) was released by Foton in 2010. Originally the Kuaiyun was a cheaper trim for cargo while the Quaike was built as a more premium trim for passengers. However the Kuaike trim was discontinued shortly due to low sales, and the Kuaijie was created as an even cheaper trim. The Kuaiyun and Kuaijie models are different trim levels featuring different front fascia designs.

Engine options of the Foton View Kuaiyun and Foton View Kuaijie includes a 2.0-liter gasoline engine, 2.2-liter gasoline engine, 2.2-liter diesel engine, 2.5-liter diesel engine and a 2.8-liter diesel engine mated to a 5-speed manual transmission.

Foton View G7/Foton View G9

The Foton MP-X S (蒙派克S) was launched in 2013 as a more premium model above the regular Foton View vans and the model was renamed to Foton View G9 as of 2016, while the Foton View G7 was released by Foton in 2014. The G7 and G9 models share all essential body parts as well as styling features with only the size being different. An additional model called the Foton View G5 was added later as a rebadged trim of the Foton MP-X.

Engine options of the Foton View G7 include a 2.0-liter gasoline engine and a 2.4 liter gasoline engine mated to a 5-speed manual transmission while engine options of the Foton View G9 includes a 2.4-liter gasoline engine and 2.8-liter turbo diesel engine mated to a 5-speed manual transmission or a 6-speed manual transmission.

Controversies
The designs of the Foton View G7 and G9 models are controversial as they heavily resemble the fifth generation Toyota HiAce (H200) with similar body styles and overall vehicle dimensions. The Jinbei Grand Haise are among the various Chinese vans from domestic brands that chose to replicate the Toyota HiAce H200 vans with only minor styling differences. Other brands include government owned manufacturers including Rely and Jinbei.

References

External links 

  (China)

Cars of China
Foton Motor vehicles
Minibuses
Cab over vehicles
Vans
Cars introduced in 2000
2000s cars
2010s cars